Alexander Betten Hansen (born 1 November 1996) is a Norwegian football defender who plays for Fredrikstad.

He played youth, B and C team football for Odd until the summer of 2015, when he moved on to Fram Larvik. He joined Mjøndalen in 2018, helped them win promotion to 2019 Eliteserien and made his Eliteserien debut in June 2019.

References

1996 births
Living people
Norwegian footballers
IF Fram Larvik players
Mjøndalen IF players
Fredrikstad FK players
Norwegian Third Division players
Norwegian Second Division players
Norwegian First Division players
Eliteserien players
Association football defenders